Star Wars Episode I.I: The Phantom Edit is a fan edit of the film Star Wars: Episode I – The Phantom Menace, removing many elements of the original film. The purpose of the edit, according to creator Mike J. Nichols, was to make a much stronger version of The Phantom Menace based on the previous execution and philosophies of film storytelling and editing of George Lucas. The Phantom Edit was the first unauthorized re-edit of The Phantom Menace to receive major publicity and acclaim and is also considered the first fan-edit of a feature film ever to be shared by an online audience.

History
The Phantom Edit was originally circulated in Hollywood studios in 2000 and 2001, and was followed by media attention. Salon.com, NPR, PBS, and the BBC all covered the edit to various degrees.

Rumor initially attributed The Phantom Edit to Kevin Smith, who admitted to having seen the re-edit but denied that he was the editor. The editor was revealed to be Mike J. Nichols of Santa Clarita, California in the September 7, 2001, edition of The Washington Post.

Available on VHS, DVD and later via BitTorrent, the DVD contains two deleted scenes and a commentary track by the editor as well as a few Easter eggs. The DVD version has also been relabeled as Episode I.II, has a slightly different podrace from the VHS version, and contains more extensive editing to individual images and sounds that have not been entirely cut.

Lucasfilm, the production company of series creator George Lucas, condoned the edit and did not pursue legal action against its distributors.

Changes
Changes made from the original film in The Phantom Edit
 Opening crawl replaced with a new one explaining why the edit was made
 Re-editing of nearly all scenes featuring Jar Jar Binks and removing some of what Nichols dubs 'Jar Jar Antics'
 Removal or re-editing of most of the Battle Droid dialogue
 Limiting of exposition throughout the film
 Trimming scenes involving politics
 Re-arrangement of shots and scenes to match the original Star Wars trilogy's presentation style
 Removal of "Yippee" and "Oops" from Anakin's dialogue
 Removal of dialogue that specifies the nature of midi-chlorians as a biological basis for Force sensitivity
 Reinstatement of deleted scenes in order to fill in plot holes in the film narrative
There were a total of 18 minutes cut from the original film, reducing the run time from 136 minutes to 119 minutes.

Reviews
Critics and filmmakers have commented on the original Phantom Edit, in most cases providing the approval and recognition which furthered the fan edit movement.

 "Smart editing to say the least" — Kevin Smith, Film Director
 "...Materialized from out of nowhere was a good film that had been hidden inside the disappointing original one." — Daniel Kraus, Salon.com (November 5, 2001)
 "[Done by]; someone with a gift (and equipment) for editing" — Michael Wilmington, Chicago Tribune Film Critic

The 2010 documentary film The People vs. George Lucas cites The Phantom Edit as a key example of the remix culture created by the Star Wars franchise.

Sequel: Attack of the Phantom
Nichols followed up his edits of Episode I with an edit of Star Wars: Episode II – Attack of the Clones.

Called Star Wars Episode II.I: Attack of the Phantom, the DVD contains a re-edited version (38 minutes cut, new runtime of 104 minutes) of Episode II in surround sound, with a commentary track.  At points during the commentary, the viewer has the option to pause the film to view in more detail some of the things that the editor is discussing.

References

External links
 Wayback Machine archive of The Phantom Edit fan website
 "The Phantom Editor Strikes Again", Joshua Griffin's April 29, 2005, review of Episode II.I: Attack of the Phantom, on TheForce.net fan site

2000 films
2000 independent films
Fan films based on Star Wars
Star Wars: Episode I – The Phantom Menace
Alternative versions of films
Unofficial adaptations
2000s American films